The Flying Irishman (aka Born to Fly) is a 1939 biographical drama film produced by RKO Pictures about Douglas Corrigan's unofficial transatlantic flight the previous year in a dilapidated Curtiss Robin light aircraft.  The film was directed by Leigh Jason based on a screenplay by Ernest Pagano and Dalton Trumbo.

The Flying Irishman covers the material of Corrigan's autobiography, That's My Story, from his early life to his return from his wrong-way flight. Because of the huge popularity of Corrigan and his flight, the screenplay assumes that the material is already familiar to its audience.

Plot

In 1938, an unlikely event unfolds as pilot Douglas Corrigan returns to the United States after his transatlantic flight, made "the wrong way" across the Atlantic. The passion to fly was there from an early age as young Douglas faced some hardships as his parents separated, leaving his mother (Dorothy Peterson) to rear two sons and a daughter.

When his mother dies, Douglas becomes the family breadwinner, putting his brother Henry (Eddie Quillan) through college. With his own funds, he becomes partners with his friend Butch (Paul Kelly), an experienced pilot, in the purchase of an aircraft. Doug aspires to attain a pilot's job, but increasing regulation of commercial aviation keeps putting the job beyond his grasp: by the time he gains the experience required, the qualification standards have been increased again. After a series of setbacks, including losing his aircraft in a crash and seeing the qualification requirements include a college degree beyond his means, Doug begins to plan an audacious feat, flying across the Atlantic just like Charles Lindbergh (who also did not have a college education), to prove his exceptional ability.

After earning enough money as a welder to purchase and modify a second-hand aircraft, Doug goes into business with Henry as a barn-stormer to finance a transatlantic attempt, but Henry eventually tires of the drudgery of eking out a living day to day. Doug learns about a new commercial airline route to Ireland and decides to make a solo flight to prove his qualifications. In New York, after his plane is grounded by an inspector, Doug's brother arranges a return flight to San Diego, lifting the flight ban. Once in the air, Doug instead heads off to Ireland, and, 28 hours later, makes it successfully to Dublin. When Doug rejects an airline offer of a job as vice-president and chief pilot because he only wants to be a pilot, he is told that his goal is impossible, because passengers going "to Cheyenne" want to be confident of arriving at the correct destination!

Cast
 Douglas Corrigan as himself
 Paul Kelly as Butch Brannan
 Robert Armstrong as Joe Alden, the flying instructor
 Gene Reynolds as Douglas Corrigan as a boy
 Donald MacBride as Roy Thompson
 Eddie Quillan as Henry Corrigan, Douglas' brother
 J. M. Kerrigan as Clyde Corrigan Sr., Douglas' father
 Dorothy Peterson as Mrs. Corrigan
 Olaf Hytten as Radio Operator (uncredited) 
 Lloyd Ingraham as Doctor (uncredited)

Production
The Flying Irishman was made quickly, with principal photography taking place from November 15 to December 1938 in Van Nuys and Culver City, California, to exploit the huge public interest in the adventure. Although the production attempted to provide an accurate account of his life story, with Corrigan as himself in the lead role, many of the other parts were played by established character actors, which undermined its attempt at realism.

Reception
The Flying Irishman was a typical "B" film in terms of length and treatment as well as having an obviously uncomfortable individual featured in the lead role, yet the "fun" of the unlikely tale was conveyed. Frank Nugent of The New York Times charitably called it a "freak picture" that, nonetheless, was "... lively, unassuming, natural and thoroughly entertaining."

References
Notes

Citations

Bibliography

 Corrigan, Douglas. That's My Story. New York: E.P. Dutton, 1938.

External links
 
 
 

1939 films
American aviation films
American black-and-white films
Films scored by Roy Webb
Films directed by Leigh Jason
RKO Pictures films
Films with screenplays by Dalton Trumbo
1930s biographical drama films
American biographical drama films
1939 drama films
Biographical films about aviators
1930s English-language films
1930s American films